Aryna Sabalenka defeated Ashleigh Barty in the final, 6–0, 3–6, 6–4 to win the women's singles tennis title at the 2021 Madrid Open. It was her 10th career WTA Tour singles title, and her first on clay.

Kiki Bertens was the defending champion from when the tournament was last held in 2019, but lost in the second round to Veronika Kudermetova. 

Paula Badosa became the first Spaniard in the tournament's history to reach the semifinals.

Seeds

Draw

Finals

Top half

Section 1

Section 2

Bottom half

Section 3

Section 4

Qualifying

Seeds

Qualifiers

Lucky losers

Draw

First qualifier

Second qualifier

Third qualifier

Fourth qualifier

Fifth qualifier

Sixth qualifier

Seventh qualifier

Eighth qualifier

Ninth qualifier

Tenth qualifier

Eleventh qualifier

Twelfth qualifier

WTA singles main draw entrants

Seeds
The following are the seeded players. Seedings are based on WTA rankings as of 26 April 2021. Rankings and points before are as of 26 April 2021.

† The player did not qualify for the tournament in 2019. Accordingly, this was her 16th best result deducted instead.

Other entrants
The following players received wildcards into the main draw:
  Paula Badosa
  Sorana Cîrstea
  Victoria Jiménez Kasintseva
  Sara Sorribes Tormo
  Venus Williams

The following players received entry using a protected ranking:
  Yaroslava Shvedova
  Elena Vesnina

The following players received entry from the qualifying draw:
  Irina-Camelia Begu
  Ana Bogdan
  Misaki Doi
  Kateryna Kozlova
  Kristina Mladenovic
  Bernarda Pera
  Anastasija Sevastova
  Laura Siegemund
  Nina Stojanović
  Ajla Tomljanović
  Tamara Zidanšek
  Vera Zvonareva

The following players received entry as lucky losers:
  Polona Hercog
  Hsieh Su-wei
  Danka Kovinić

Withdrawals
Before the tournament
  Bianca Andreescu → replaced by  Zheng Saisai
  Danielle Collins → replaced by  Magda Linette
  Fiona Ferro → replaced by  Elena Vesnina
  Sofia Kenin → replaced by  Shelby Rogers
  Svetlana Kuznetsova → replaced by  Polona Hercog
  Garbiñe Muguruza → replaced by  Danka Kovinić
  Barbora Strýcová → replaced by  Yaroslava Shvedova
  Donna Vekić → replaced by  Sloane Stephens
  Serena Williams → replaced by  Hsieh Su-wei
  Dayana Yastremska → replaced by  Jeļena Ostapenko

During the tournament
  Victoria Azarenka

Retirements
  Marie Bouzková
  Elise Mertens

References

External links 
 Main draw
 Qualifying draw

Women's 1
2021 WTA Tour